The 2007–08 Ford Ranger One Day Cup was the 38th season of official List A domestic cricket in Australia.  Six teams representing six states in Australia took part in the competition.  The competition began on 10 October 2007 when the 2006–07 season's champions, the Queensland Bulls took on the Tasmanian Tigers at the Gabba.

After several months delay when it was reported that the naming rights for the One Day Domestic Competition had lapsed, it was determined that for the 2007–08 season it would remain as the Ford Ranger Cup.

The 2007–08 Cup Final was played on 23 February 2008 at Bellerive Oval.  In a low-scoring but dramatic, rain-interrupted match, Tasmania defeated Victoria by 1 wicket with only 5 balls to spare.  Victoria scored 158, but the Tasmanians' innings target was reduced to 131 runs from 31 overs under the Duckworth–Lewis method.

Table

The top two teams after each round was played competed in the Ford Ranger One Day Cup final. The match was contested at the home ground of the side that finished first. (For an explanation of how points are rewarded, see Ford Ranger One Day Cup – Points system).

Teams

Fixtures

Group matches

Final

Statistics

Highest Team Totals

Most Runs

Highest Scores

Most Wickets

Best Bowling Figures

See also

 2007–08 Pura Cup season
 2007–08 KFC Twenty20 Big Bash
 Australian cricket team in 2007–08

References

External links
 Cricket Web
 Cricket Australia
 Baggygreen

Australian domestic limited-overs cricket tournament seasons
Domestic cricket competitions in 2007–08
Ford Ranger